Pavel Marin (born 14 June 1995) is an Estonian professional footballer who plays as an attacking midfielder for Estonian club Nõmme Kalju and the Estonia national team.

Club career

Puuma
Marin first played for a local club Keila, before moving to SC Real in 2007. He made his senior league debut in 2011, playing for Esiliiga team Puuma.

Levadia
In July 2013, Marin moved to Levadia's reserve team Levadia II. He signed his first professional contract with the club in December 2013. Marin made his debut for Levadia's first team on 25 February 2014, in an Estonian Supercup match against Flora, as the team lost 0–1. He made his debut in the Meistriliiga on 15 March 2014, and scored in an 8–0 away win over Tallinna Kalev. Marin won his first Meistriliiga title in the 2014 season.

KPV (loan)
On 3 August 2018, Marin joined Ykkönen club KPV on loan until the end of the season.

Viljandi Tulevik 
On December 10th 2020, as somewhat of a surprise for the fans, Marin joined Premium Liiga side Viljandi Tulevik, stating he had numerous other offers from Estonia and abroad but took the offer because he was seen as a key player in the team by the manager Sander Post. 

He scored his first goal for the club in the second round of Premium Liiga already in a 2:1 away win against Paide Linnameeskond and quickly became an irreplaceable player and top scorer for the team. In October 2020 he received a call-up to the Estonian national team as a first active player from the again-independent Tulevik. He then went on to make the club's history in other aspects as well: he was in a starting eleven in the match against Lithuania in a friendly game and scored Estonia's only goal in a 1:3 loss. In the end Marin played in all three matches in that particular national team break.

International career
Marin made his senior international debut for Estonia on 29 May 2016, in a 0–2 loss to Lithuania at the 2016 Baltic Cup. He scored his first international goal on 22 November 2016, in a 1–0 away win over Antigua and Barbuda in a friendly.

International goals
As of 12 October 2020. Estonia score listed first, score column indicates score after each Marin goal.

Honours

Club
Levadia II
Esiliiga: 2013

Levadia
Meistriliiga: 2014
Estonian Cup: 2013–14, 2017–18
Estonian Supercup: 2015, 2018

References

External links

1995 births
Living people
People from Keila
Estonian footballers
Estonian people of Russian descent
Association football midfielders
Keila JK players
Esiliiga players
FC Puuma Tallinn players
FCI Levadia U21 players
Meistriliiga players
FCI Levadia Tallinn players
Ykkönen players
Kokkolan Palloveikot players
Estonia youth international footballers
Estonia under-21 international footballers
Estonia international footballers
Estonian expatriate footballers
Expatriate footballers in Finland
Estonian expatriate sportspeople in Finland